Guppedantha Prema is a 2016 Indian Telugu-language romantic drama film written and directed by Vinod Lingala. The film stars Sai Ronak, Aditi Singh (Telugu debut) and Aishwarya. Navneeth Sundar composed the film's music. The film released on 17 June 2016 worldwide. The song "Sakhiya Sakhiya" was well received.

Cast 

Sai Ronak as Yuv
Aditi Singh as Sandy
Aishwarya as Swara
Abhilash as Raja (Swara's Friend)
Naveen Neni as Mukesh (Yuv's Friend)
Anand as Sandy's Father
Noel Sean as Abhi (Book Reader)
Shraddhha Pancholie as Sandy's Mother
Pratheek as Yuv's Friend

Release
123 Telugu said that "Despite an interesting first 20 minutes in the second half, the film lacks an emotionally engaging narrative and makes the audiences crave for more".

References

External links
Guppedantha Prema at Eenadu

2010s Telugu-language films